The US Sailing Championship of Champions is a sailing competition organized by US Sailing annually since 1976. The winner takes the Jack Brown Trophy.

Champions

External links 
Official website

United States Sailing Championships